Mohammed Gassid Kadhim Al-Jaberi (born 10 December 1986) is an Iraqi professional footballer who plays as a goalkeeper for Iraqi Premier League club Al-Najaf.

Honours
Al-Shorta
 Iraqi Premier League: 2012–13

Al-Zawraa
 Iraqi Premier League: 2015–16

Al-Quwa Al-Jawiya
 AFC Cup: 2018

Iraq
 AFC Asian Cup: 2007
 Asian Games silver medalist: 2006
 WAFF Championship runner-up: 2012
 Arab Cup third place: 2012

References

External links 
 
 
 
Mohammed Gassid at Goalzz

1986 births
Living people
Sportspeople from Baghdad
Iraqi footballers
Association football goalkeepers
Al-Karkh SC players
Al-Naft SC players
Al-Shorta SC players
Al-Zawraa SC players
Erbil SC players
Al-Talaba SC players
Al-Quwa Al-Jawiya players
Najaf FC players
Iraqi Premier League players
Iraq youth international footballers
Iraq international footballers
Footballers at the 2006 Asian Games
2007 AFC Asian Cup players
2009 FIFA Confederations Cup players
2011 AFC Asian Cup players
2019 AFC Asian Cup players
Asian Games medalists in football
Asian Games silver medalists for Iraq
Medalists at the 2006 Asian Games
AFC Asian Cup-winning players
AFC Cup winning players